Nowdar (also known as Nowdan) is a village in Barakuh Rural District, Jolgeh-e Mazhan District, Khusf County, South Khorasan Province, Iran. At the 2006 census, its population was 33, in 14 families.

References 

Populated places in Khusf County